List of Ministers of Labour and Social Insurance of the Republic of Cyprus since the independence in 1960:

External links 
  Official list of the Ministry of Labour and Social Insurance of Cyprus

Labour